Ex tempore or extempore is a Latin phrase.
Extemporaneous speaking
Ex Tempore (magazine) literary magazine published annually by the United Nations Society of Writers
Extempore (short story)
Extempore (software)
Improvisational theater